The 1993 Skate America was held at Reunion Arena in Dallas, Texas. Medals were awarded in the disciplines of men's singles, ladies' singles, pair skating, and ice dancing.

Results

Men

Ladies

Pairs

Ice dancing

External links
 Skate Canada results

Skate America, 1993
Skate America